Night Alone is a 1938 British comedy film directed by Thomas Bentley and starring Emlyn Williams, Leonora Corbett and Lesley Brook. The film was shot at the Welwyn Studios of Associated British. It was based on a play by Jeffrey Dell.

Cast
 Emlyn Williams as Charles Seaton
 Leonora Corbett as Vi
 Lesley Brook as Barbara Seaton
 Cyril Raymond as Tommy
 Julie Suedo as Gloria
 Margot Landa as Celia
 Wally Patch as Policeman
 John Turnbull as Superintendent

References

Bibliography
 Low, Rachael. Filmmaking in 1930s Britain. George Allen & Unwin, 1985.
 Wood, Linda. British Films, 1927-1939. British Film Institute, 1986.

External links

1938 films
1938 comedy films
British comedy films
1930s English-language films
Films directed by Thomas Bentley
British films based on plays
British black-and-white films
1930s British films
Films shot at Welwyn Studios